Abbas (known as Abbaskənd until 1999) is a village and municipality in the Shaki Rayon of Azerbaijan. It has a population of 548.

References

Populated places in Shaki District